Richard B. Woodward has been an arts critic in New York since 1985. His contributions have appeared in The New York Times. Alongside New York Times, he also writes for The Wall Street Journal. His reviews and articles have appeared in numerous publications, including The Atlantic, Bookforum, Film Comment, The American Scholar, The New Yorker, Vanity Fair, Interview, Vogue, and The New Criterion. Essays on art and photography by Woodward have been featured in over 20 monographs and museum catalogs.

Woodward suffers from idiopathic pulmonary fibrosis (IPF).

References

External links
Huffington Post profile

Year of birth missing (living people)
Living people
The New York Times people
The Wall Street Journal people
HuffPost writers and columnists